Peter Aagaard Jensen (born 19 February 1956) is a Danish sports shooter. He competed in the mixed trap event at the 1988 Summer Olympics.

References

1956 births
Living people
Danish male sport shooters
Olympic shooters of Denmark
Shooters at the 1988 Summer Olympics
Place of birth missing (living people)
20th-century Danish people